Beaman is a city in Grundy County, Iowa, United States. The population was 161 at the 2020 census. It is part of the Waterloo−Cedar Falls Metropolitan Statistical Area.

History
Beaman was originally called Wadiloupe. The present name is for H. H. Beaman, the original owner of the town site.

A post office was established as Wadiloup in 1867, renamed Beaman in 1875, and remains in operation.

Demographics

2010 census
As of the census of 2010, there were 191 people, 78 households, and 50 families residing in the city. The racial makeup of the city was 96.9% White, 0.5% Asian, 2.1% Pacific Islander, and 0.5% from two or more races. Hispanic or Latino of any race were 1.0% of the population.

There were 78 households, of which 35.9% had children under the age of 18 living with them, 44.9% were married couples living together, 7.7% had a female householder with no husband present, 11.5% had a male householder with no wife present, and 35.9% were non-families. 29.5% of all households were made up of individuals, and 9% had someone living alone who was 65 years of age or older. The average household size was 2.45 and the average family size was 2.98.

The median age in the city was 38.3 years. 30.4% of residents were under the age of 18; 5.2% were between the ages of 18 and 24; 22.1% were from 25 to 44; 29.9% were from 45 to 64; and 12.6% were 65 years of age or older. The gender makeup of the city was 53.9% male and 46.1% female.

2000 census
As of the census of 2000, there were 210 people, 86 households, and 58 families residing in the city. The racial makeup of the city was 99.52% White and 0.48% Native American.

There were 86 households, out of which 33.7% had children under the age of 18 living with them, 54.7% were married couples living together, 8.1% had a female householder with no husband present, and 31.4% were non-families. 26.7% of all households were made up of individuals, and 8.1% had someone living alone who was 65 years of age or older. The average household size was 2.44 and the average family size was 2.93.

In the city, the population was spread out, with 29.0% under the age of 18, 8.1% from 18 to 24, 29.5% from 25 to 44, 17.1% from 45 to 64, and 16.2% who were 65 years of age or older. The median age was 36 years. For every 100 females, there were 103.9 males. For every 100 females age 18 and over, there were 106.9 males.

The median income for a household in the city was $45,750, and the median income for a family was $46,500. Males had a median income of $31,964 versus $21,042 for females. The per capita income for the city was $18,960. None of the families and 0.5% of the population were living below the poverty line.

Geography
Beaman is located at  (42.219997, −92.822985).

Climate
Designated as having a humid continental climate, this region typically has a large seasonal temperature differences, with warm to hot (and often humid) summers and cold (sometimes severely cold) winters. Precipitation is relatively well distributed year-round in many areas with this climate.  The Köppen Climate Classification subtype for this climate is "Dfa". (Hot Summer Continental Climate).

Government and infrastructure
The city maintains its own fire department, with a fire station built in 1990. The Grundy County Sheriff's Department provides law enforcement services under contract to Beaman. Emergency Medical Services (EMS) are provided both by the Beaman Conrad Emergency Response Team, a volunteer first responder service housed in the nearby city of Conrad's fire department, and the Marshalltown Area Paramedic Service which is stationed in Marshalltown.

Education
BCLUW Community School District operates public schools serving Beaman. The schools are BCLUW Elementary School in Conrad, BCLUW Middle School in Union, and BCLUW High School in Conrad.

The Beaman-Conrad-Lipscomb school district served Beaman until July 1, 1992, when it merged into BCLUW.

The city operates the Beaman Community Memorial Library. The library includes the Beaman Heritage Center, which serves as a community museum.

Parks and recreation
The Beaman City Park is located in the city's downtown. The Beaman Gym serves as a recreational space; the city government had purchased it from the school district in the 1980s. The Beaman Memorial Hall serves as a meeting space for area organizations. The Beaman Arboretum in eastern Beaman serves as a nature area; it has  of space. The Tennis Court Park includes a facility that serves as a basketball and tennis court in warmer months and an ice skating rink in the winter.

References

External links
 BCLUW (Beaman, Conrad, Liscomb, Union and Whitten) School District homepage
 The Record Website
 Beaman City Website

Cities in Iowa
Cities in Grundy County, Iowa
Waterloo – Cedar Falls metropolitan area